Miguel Silva Reisinho (born 9 April 1999) is a Portuguese professional footballer who plays for Boavista as a midfielder.

Club career
Born on 9 April 1999 in Vila Nova de Gaia, Porto Metropolitan Area, Reisinho joined Vitória de Guimarães from F.C. Paços de Ferreira in 2014, and signed his first professional contract in June 2017. On 13 August, he made his professional debut with the reserve team in a 2017–18 LigaPro match against Oliveirense, a home goalless draw.

On 2 September 2019, Reisinho signed a three-year deal with Boavista F.C. of the Primeira Liga. His former club retained 60% of his economic rights and first preference on his next transfer. He made his top-flight debut on 6 December in a 4–1 home loss to leaders S.L. Benfica, as a 58th-minute substitute for Marlon Xavier.

In November 2020, Reisinho suffered a cruciate ligament break on his left knee. The following May, having not yet recovered, he signed a new contract until 2025. In October 2021, having played only 17 games in three years across all competitions, he picked up a training injury on the same ligaments.

International career
From under-18 to under-20 level, Reisinho earned 12 caps for Portugal. His only appearance for the final one of those teams was on 30 January 2019, as a substitute in a 3–0 friendly win over Cape Verde in Covilhã.

Personal life
Reisinho's father, also named Miguel, was a footballer who represented teams such as F.C. Penafiel and Paços de Ferreira.

References

External links

National team data 

1999 births
Living people
Sportspeople from Vila Nova de Gaia
Portuguese footballers
Association football midfielders
Liga Portugal 2 players
Primeira Liga players
Vitória S.C. B players
Boavista F.C. players
Portugal youth international footballers